Alessandro Bernabei (1580–1630) was an Italian painter of the late-Renaissance or Mannerist period, active in his native Parma. Two of his brothers were painters: his twin, Francesco, and his elder brother Pier Antonio Bernabei, also called Della Casa or Maccabeo. 
 
He painted a Dying St Joseph for the church of San Pietro, Parma.

References

16th-century Italian painters
Italian male painters
17th-century Italian painters
Painters from Parma
Italian Renaissance painters
1580 births
1630 deaths